Stars on Parade is a 1936 British musical film directed by Oswald Mitchell and Challis Sanderson and starring Robb Wilton, Arthur Lucan and Kitty McShane. It takes the form of a variety show featuring a number of music hall acts. It was made at Cricklewood Studios in North London. It was a released as a first feature on a Double Bill with the supporting feature What the Puppy Said.

Cast
 Robb Wilton - Norman, the police sergeant 
 Arthur Lucan - Old Mother Riley 
 Kitty McShane - Kitty Riley 
 Sam Barton - Himself 
 Mabel Constanduros - Grandma Buggins 
 Horace Goldin - Himself 
 Max Harrison - Himself 
 Syd Harrison - Himself 
 Pat Hyde - (Accordionist) Herself 
 Jimmy James - Himself 
 Edwin Laurence - Speaker at Meeting 
 Navarre - Himself 
 Pat O'Brien - Himself 
 John Rorke - Himself 
 The Sherman Fisher Girls - Themselves, Dancers 
 Debroy Somers - Himself, Bandleader 
 Albert Whelan - Tea Stall Proprietor

References
Notes

Bibliography
 Chibnall, Steve. Quota Quickies: The Birth of the British 'B' film. British Film Institute, 2007.

External links

1936 films
British musical films
Films directed by Challis Sanderson
Films directed by Oswald Mitchell
Films set in England
British black-and-white films
1936 musical films
1930s English-language films
1930s British films